FK Baník Ružiná was a Slovak football team, based in the village of Ružiná. The club was founded in 1961 and in 2014 the club was merged with MFK Lokomotíva Zvolen.

Notable players 
Past (and present) players who are the subjects of Wikipedia articles can be found here.

External links 
Official club website 
 
Unofficial website 

Banik Ruzina
Banik Ruzina
Banik Ruzina
1961 establishments in Slovakia